Ephippioceratidae is a family of clydonatilacean nautilids with shells as in the Liroceratidae but with sutures that have deep ventral and dorsal saddles.  This group, which contains two genera, Ephippioceras  and Megaglossoceras, has a range from the Mississippian to the Lower Permian.

Ephippioceras, which has the full range of the family, has a broad, narrowly peaked ( V-shaped) ventral saddle and may have been derived from Liroceras early in the Mississippian. Megaglossoceras from the  Pennsylvanian of North America, with its large, broadly arched, tongue-like ventral saddle is an obvious offshoot of Ephippioceras. Both are subglobular and involute with a reniform whorl section. Ephippioceras has been found in North America, Europe, and China.

References
Bernhard Kummel, 1964. Nautiloidea -Nautilida; Treatise on Invertebrate Paleontology, Part K. Geol Soc of America and Univ  of Kansas press, R.C. Moore (ed)

Nautiloids
Mississippian first appearances
Cisuralian extinctions